Desportivo Brasil Participações Ltda., commonly referred to as Desportivo Brasil, is a Brazilian professional association football club based in Porto Feliz, São Paulo. The team competes in the Campeonato Paulista Série A3, the third tier of the São Paulo state football league.

History
Traffic Group founded Desportivo Brasil on November 19, 2005, and has managed the club since then. English club Manchester United announced a link-up with Desportivo Brasil on November 27, 2008, with a view to exchanging players to play in games and experience a different style of coaching.

Stadium
Desportivo Brasil since 2010 play their home games at Estádio Municipal Alfredo Chiavegato, located in Jaguariúna. The stadium has a maximum capacity of 15,000 people. The club previously played their home games at Estádio Municipal Vila Porto, which has a maximum capacity of 5,000 people.

References

External links 
 Official website

Association football clubs established in 2005
Football clubs in São Paulo (state)
2005 establishments in Brazil